The 2003–04 UAB Blazers men's basketball team represented the University of Alabama at Birmingham as a member of the Conference USA during the 2003–04 NCAA Division I men's basketball season. This was head coach Mike Anderson's second season at UAB, and the Blazers played their home games at Bartow Arena. They finished the season 22–10, 12–4 in C-USA play and lost in the semifinals of the C-USA tournament. They received an at-large bid to the NCAA tournament as No. 9 seed in the St. Louis region. The Blazers defeated Washington and No. 1 seed Kentucky to reach the Sweet Sixteen. In the Regional semifinal, UAB fell to Kansas, 100–74.

Roster

Schedule and results

|-
!colspan=9 style=| Regular season

|-
!colspan=9 style=| C-USA tournament

|-
!colspan=9 style=| NCAA tournament

Rankings

References

UAB Blazers men's basketball seasons
UAB
UAB